Melonie Gillett (born August 23, 1984) is a Belizean singer and songwriter. She has released an EP album entitled "Rush" and an album "The Dreamer".

Early life

While she was born and attending high school in Belize City, Melonie was raised in Burrell Boom. She also attended Community College in the city, where she became a Certified Network Engineer. Upon returning to her home village, Melonie began to experiment with music, entering competitions and ultimately recording music. She has said her biggest influences and motivation has been her family. Some of her biggest influences outside of her family include; Whitney Houston, Mariah Carey, Celine Dion, Bob Marley, Abba, Karen Carpenter, and Lauryn Hill.

Career
Melonie's performance of Whitney Houston's "I Will Always Love You" on Karaoke Television in 2005, and again in 2007, brought her popularity in Belize. The release of her first single "Rush" brought he to the forefront of Belizean music. Performing with the likes of international Reggae artists such as Munga Honorable, Duane Stephenson, Pressure, Konshens, and Etana, helped to further establish Melonie as one of the premier artists in Belize.

Albums

DD = Digital downloads

References

1984 births
Living people
People from Belize City
Belizean musicians